Galt Football Club was a soccer club based in Galt, Ontario, current day Cambridge, Ontario. It was formed in either 1881 or 1882. Galt won the 1901, 1902, and 1903 Ontario Cups, and most notably the 1904 Olympic soccer tournament.

History
Galt was historically one of the greatest soccer clubs in Canada. Their first major honour came in the form of the 1901 Ontario Cup and they repeated this success as champions in the next two seasons. In 1903, Galt went on a tour of Manitoba. In a span of 25 days, which included 17 games, Galt won 16 and tied 1. On that tour, they scored 46 goals and conceded 2.

Galt's most notable triumph came in 1904 at the Olympics in St. Louis, where they represented Canada. They had to face two American sides. Winning convincingly, 7–0 and 4–0, Galt took home gold for Canada.

In 1905, Galt played a touring English team called The Pilgrims. The game was dubbed "The Championship of the World", considering Galt were reigning Olympic champions.  The game drew much attention in Canada and the Northern United States.  At Dickson Park, in front of 3,500 fans, Galt tied the English team 3–3.

In 2004, on the centennial anniversary of the gold medal, the 1904 Galt team were inducted to the Canadian Soccer Hall of Fame.

Galt F.C. was featured in the Murdoch Mysteries episode "Bend It Like Brackenreid." Brackenreid returned with the gold medal in episode "Excitable Chap".

See also
Football at the 1904 Summer Olympics – Men's team squads

References

Soccer clubs in Ontario
Sport in Cambridge, Ontario
Olympic gold medalists for Canada
Football at the 1904 Summer Olympics
Association football clubs established in the 19th century
Association football clubs disestablished in 1910